Parklands High School was a secondary school located in the Speke area of Liverpool, England. It closed in summer 2014 with pupils transferring to other local schools.

The school was located on Ganworth Road in Speke, Liverpool.

The school opened in 2002 as a replacement for Speke Comprehensive School. The school was placed into special measures following a 2013 Ofsted inspection.

References 

Defunct schools in Liverpool
Educational institutions established in 2002
Educational institutions disestablished in 2014
2014 disestablishments in England
2002 establishments in England